Gāo (Chinese: 皋) was an ancient king of China, the 15th ruler of the semi-legendary Xia Dynasty. He possibly ruled for 11 years.

In the 3rd year of his regime, Gao restored the power of Shiwei(豕韋)  , the nobleman deposed by Kong Jia, the father of Gao.

Sources 

Xia dynasty kings